George Albert Flynn (May 24, 1871 – December 28, 1901) was a professional baseball player who was an outfielder in the Major Leagues in 1896.  He would play for the Chicago Colts.

External links

1871 births
1901 deaths
Major League Baseball outfielders
Chicago Colts players
19th-century baseball players
Marinette Badgers players
Mobile Blackbirds players
Peoria Distillers players
Indianapolis Hoosiers (minor league) players
Indianapolis Indians players
St. Joseph Saints players
Nashville Vols players
Columbus Senators players
Baseball players from Chicago